Disney's Fort Wilderness Resort & Campground is a themed camping resort located in the Magic Kingdom Resort Area at the Walt Disney World Resort in the U.S. state of Florida. It officially opened on November 19, 1971. The resort is situated adjacent to Bay Lake, near Disney's Wilderness Lodge. It also formerly contained Disney's River Country, a water park which closed on November 2, 2001.

Resort

Fort Wilderness Resort & Campground has a rustic theme and is located on 750 acres of Pine and Cypress forest. Tree-lined winding roads loop around to the various regions of the resort. Part of the resort is occupied by campsites where visitors with tents or recreational vehicles can stay. The remainder of the lodging area is occupied by permanent trailers, designed to resemble log cabins.

Dogs are allowed to camp on certain pet-friendly loops for an additional $5 a night. The dogs are not allowed to stay in pop-up trailers or tents.

Dining
The resort hosts a dinner show, the Hoop-Dee-Doo Musical Revue. A buffet called Trail's End and an RV-themed food truck are among the resort's other dining options.

Recreation
The resort features playgrounds and two heated swimming pools. One of the pools, the Meadow Swimmin' Pool, features a winding water slide that includes the water tower from the now-closed River Country water park. Other activities include fishing and horseback riding. A  paved and sand exercise trail extends from the pony farm to Disney's Wilderness Lodge Resort. They also provide canoes, kayaks, bikes, and tennis rackets to rent at the bike barn. Guests can make reservations to learn archery and go horseback riding. At the marina, pontoon boats and other watercraft are available for rent to travel the waterways of Bay Lake and the Seven Seas Lagoon.

Entertainment
Located next to the Beach, guests can visit the Tri Circle D ranch, where the horses that work at Magic Kingdom live. Trail rides, carriage, and hay rides, are also available for an additional cost. Each night, the campground features the Campfire Sing-Along with Chip 'n' Dale presented by Pop Secret. A Disney cast member leads songs in an outdoor amphitheater, while the characters Chip 'n' Dale approach seated audience members, signing autographs and posing for photos. Two firepits are available for roasting marshmallows and making s'mores. Following the sing-along, a Disney movie is shown on an outdoor screen. There is a food truck that sells lunch, dinner, as well as s'mores kits for a nominal cost. At night the Electrical Water Pageant and the Magic Kingdom's Disney Enchantment Fireworks Spectacular can be seen from Clementine's beach.

Transportation
Public transport within the resort is provided exclusively by Disney Transport buses.

See also

References

Bibliography

External links

Disney's Fort Wilderness Resort & Campground official site (Cabins)
Disney's Fort Wilderness Resort & Campground official site (Campsites)

1971 establishments in Florida
Buildings and structures in Lake Buena Vista, Florida
Campgrounds in the United States
Tourist attractions in Orange County, Florida
Walt Disney World